Deshon Taylor (born March 17, 1996) is an American professional basketball player for Kouvot of the Korisliiga. He played college basketball for the UMKC Kangaroos and Fresno State Bulldogs.

High school career
Taylor was born in Los Angeles, California, to Desha Taylor and Terri Bailey. He played at John W. North High School in Riverside, California, and helped lead his team to four consecutive league titles. As a senior, Taylor averaged 24.2 points, 4.7 rebounds, 2.3 assists and 2.6 steals a game while earning conference MVP, first-team all-state and all-county honors. He was recruited by Hawaii, UC Riverside and Portland State, but committed to play for the UMKC Kangaroos.

College career

UMKC
As a freshman at the University of Missouri–Kansas City, Taylor started 10 of his 33 games. He averaged 7.6 points, 2.0 rebounds and 1.3 assists a game. At the season's end, he elected to transfer from the program.

Fresno State
Taylor chose to transfer to Fresno State as a walk-on due to the university being close to home and wanting to reunite with past teammates who were on the roster. Per National Collegiate Athletic Association (NCAA) regulations, Taylor redshirted during the Bulldogs' 2015–16 season. 

In his sophomore season and debut season at Fresno State, Taylor played a sixth man role, starting 15 of his 33 games. He averaged 12.5 points, 2.4 rebounds and 2.1 assists. Taylor was named to the All-Mountain West Third Team.

During his junior season, Taylor was elevated to a permanent starting position. He scored a career-high 32 points against Nevada on January 31, 2018. He averaged team-highs in points (17.8) and assists (2.6), as well as 3.2 rebounds a game. His 200 made free throws were a single season program record. Taylor was named to the All-Mountain West First Team and All-Defense Team. He initially declared for the 2018 NBA draft, but elected to return to Fresno State for his senior season.

Before the start of his final season at Fresno State, Taylor was named to the 2018–19 Mountain West Preseason All-Conference Team. On March 10, 2019, Taylor set a new career high in points with 37 to help win Fresno State's regular season finale against San Jose State. This game, coupled with a 25-point performance in a win against San Diego State, earned Taylor his first MW Player of the Week award on March 11, 2019. In the quarterfinals of the 2019 Mountain West Conference tournament against Air Force, Taylor led his team to a win with 18 points and set a career high in assists with 10. In his final game for Fresno State, Taylor scored six points in a loss to Utah State in the Mountain West Conference tournament semifinals. Taylor finished the season averaging 17.9 points, 3.7 rebounds and 5.0 assists a game. He ranked in the top 10 in nine of the 13 major individual statistical categories in the Mountain West, which was the most of any player in the conference. Taylor finished his career at Fresno State as the program's seventh all-time leading scorer with 1,482 points.

Professional career
After going undrafted in the 2019 NBA draft, Taylor played for the Philadelphia 76ers during the NBA Summer League. He went on to spend preseason in Australia with the Adelaide 36ers of the Australian National Basketball League (NBL) but was released before the start of the regular season as the team decided to resign Jerome Randle. Taylor then had a probationary period with Latvian team VEF Rīga where he did not appear in a game but participated in team practices. On October 31, 2019, he was released by VEF Rīga in order to return to Australia, signing with the Sydney Kings as an injury replacement for Kevin Lisch. Upon Lisch's return, Taylor's stint with the Kings was extended when he was nominated to serve as an injury replacement for Craig Moller. He was removed from the playing roster prior to the start of the playoffs due to the team's return to health but stayed with the Kings while they appeared in the 2020 NBL Finals, where they lost in a shortened finals series to the Perth Wildcats.

On January 12, 2021, Taylor signed with the Canterbury Rams of the New Zealand National Basketball League (NZNBL) for the 2021 New Zealand NBL season. In 18 games, he averaged 22.9 points, 4.8 rebounds, 4.8 assists and 2.5 steals per game.

For the 2021–22 season, Taylor joined Kouvot of the Finnish Korisliiga. In 13 games, he averaged 17 points, 3.9 rebounds, 3 assists and 2 steals per game. In December 2021, he joined Atomerőmű SE of the Hungarian Nemzeti Bajnokság I/A.

Taylor rejoined Kouvot for the 2022–23 season. He was named as the league's player of the month in October 2022 as he averaged 27.3 points per game.

Career statistics

College

|-
| style="text-align:left;"|2014–15
| style="text-align:left;"|UMKC
| 33 || 10 || 23.2 || .408 || .394 || .803 || 2.0 || 1.3 || .9 || .1 || 7.6
|-
| style="text-align:left;"|2016–17
| style="text-align:left;"|Fresno State
| 33 || 16 || 28.2 || .443 || .403 || .879 || 2.4 || 2.1 || 1.2 || .1 || 12.5
|-
| style="text-align:left;"|2017–18
| style="text-align:left;"|Fresno State
| 32 || 30 || 33.8 || .439 || .386 || .833 || 3.2 || 2.6 || 1.5 || .2 || 17.8
|-
| style="text-align:left;"|2018–19
| style="text-align:left;"|Fresno State
| 28 || 27 || 35.6 || .446 || .401 || .784 || 3.7 || 5.0 || 1.4 || .2 || 17.9
|- class="sortbottom"
| style="text-align:center;" colspan="2"| Career
| 126 || 83 || 29.9 || .437 || .396 || .829 || 2.8 || 2.7 || 1.3 || .1 || 13.7

Personal life
Taylor is a cousin of former NBA player Quincy Pondexter. He has a son.

References

1996 births
Living people
American expatriate basketball people in Australia
American expatriate basketball people in Finland
American expatriate basketball people in Hungary
American expatriate basketball people in New Zealand
American men's basketball players
Atomerőmű SE players
Basketball players from Los Angeles
Basketball players from Riverside, California
Canterbury Rams players
Fresno State Bulldogs men's basketball players
Kansas City Roos men's basketball players
Kouvot players
Point guards
Sydney Kings players